Al-Harith ibn Kalada (d. 13 AH/634–35) was an Arab physician and a companion of the Islamic prophet Muhammad. He is said to have traveled to Gundeshapur in search of medical knowledge before the advent of Islam.

References

Further reading
 C. Pellat, "al-Harith B. Kalada," EI2, supplement (1980).

External links
 

Banu Thaqif
Companions of the Prophet
Physicians of the medieval Islamic world
7th-century physicians
630s deaths
Year of birth unknown
Hejaz